Troy Shaw (born 6 October 1969) is an English former professional snooker player.

Career
Competing on the main tour from 1991, Shaw won the second leg of minor ranking tournament the Strachan Challenge in 1993, beating Nigel Bond in the final. He reached his highest ranking, 74th, the following year. At the end of the 2002–03 snooker season, Shaw was ranked 94th and did not qualify to remain on the professional tour.

Performance and rankings timeline

Career finals

Minor-ranking finals: 1 (1 title)

Pro-am finals: 2 (1 title)

References

1969 births
Living people
English snooker players
People from Lowestoft